Motabbaq is a stuffed pancake or pan-fried bread which is commonly found in the Arabian Peninsula and Southeast Asia, notably in Saudi Arabia, Yemen, Indonesia, Malaysia, Singapore, Brunei, Thailand and Bangladesh (Mughlai paratha). Depending on the location, the name and ingredients can significantly vary. The name mutabbaq in Arabic means "folded". It is a popular street food in Yemen, Indonesia, Malaysia, Thailand and Singapore.

Murtabak is often described as spicy folded omelette pancake with bits of vegetables. The most common form of murtabak is made from pan fried crepes usually  stuffed with beaten eggs, chopped leeks, chives, or green onion (scallions) and minced meat, which is then folded and cut to squares. In Indonesia, the murtabak is one of the most popular street foods and is known as martabak.

Vegetarian murtabaks and other forms of murtabaks with chicken and other stuffings exist and can be found in many Yemeni, Indian Muslim restaurants in Singapore, including the Little India area and Arab Street.

In Malaysia, murtabak was originally sold in Indian Muslim restaurants and stalls, and usually includes minced meat (beef or chicken, sometimes goat meat, mutton) along with garlic, egg and onion, and is eaten with curry or gravy, sliced cucumber, syrup-pickled onions or tomato sauce. The dish is sold throughout the country, with diverse variations in ingredients and cooking style, and has been adopted by Malay Muslim sellers as well. In Yemen, murtabak also usually includes goat meat or mutton.

In Indonesia, Martabak is a renowned street food that comes in two types: Martabak Manis and Martabak telur. Martabak Manis or Terang Bulan is originally a thick and sweet pancake that is usually topped with various toppings ranging from chocolate, cheese, peanuts, condensed milk, sesame seed and margarine. Today, Martabak toppings consist of international favours such as Skippy Peanut Butter spread, Ovomaltine, Toblerone, Lotus Biscoff and Durian Spread. Martabak Manis also recently comes in a thin and crispy variety, known as Martabak Tipis Kering (Tipker). Martabak Telur, the savoury type, are crispy pancakes that consist of eggs, chicken or beef meat and scallions.

History

The word mutabbaq in Arabic means "folded". This suggests that Murtabak might originate from Yemen, which had a sizeable Indian population; through Indian traders it spread back to their home countries. Murtabak was brought to Southeast Asia by Tamil Muslim traders. The dish referred to as murtabak is a multi-layered pancake that originated in the state of Kerala where the people referred to as "mamaks" ("mama" means "uncle" in Tamil) hail from. The word "mutabar" is the original name for the particular dish referred to in other languages and dialects as "murtabak." "Mutabar" is an amalgam of two words, "muta" (being the Keralite word for egg, a significant component of the dish) and "bar," an abbreviated form of the word barota, or "bratha roti" (the bread). The bread base or pancake on which it is then spread over is referred to in Hindi as "pratha roti" or "pratha" or "parantha" Other than that, "murtabak" is also known to be another version of the Mughlai paratha popular in Kolkata, India.
 
There are similar versions of the bread in places such as Yemen and other regions of the Arabic world and Persia. All of these places in the Middle East were visited by Indian traders centuries ago and it would not be unusual for them to have learned from each other or to have adopted each other's culinary habits and practices. However, the word "mutabar" is the original name for the egg, chilli, and onion flavoured multi-layered pancake.

In Indonesia, Martabak Manis is originated from the Bangka Belitung Islands, by Chinese Descents (Hokkien and Khek) and it was named “Hok Lo Pan” which translates to “Hok Lo ethnicity’s cake.” Its traditional topping includes sugar and sesame seeds. Martabak Manis has different names in different regions. In West Borneo, it is called Apam Pinang, similar to Malaysia's Apam Balik. In Central Java, Martabak Manis is referred to as “Kue Bandung” which means Bandung cake. The origin of Kue Bandung started when a man from Bangka Belitung, opened a Martabak Manis stall beside a “Bandung Noodle” stall.

In countries where martabak is widely available, it is so common it has become an everyday dish. This dish is made not only at home, but often found in inexpensive food service menus specialising in traditional cuisine, which is why has the reputation of street food. Sometimes martabak – especially sweet – go on sale in stores already in finished form.

Variants

Savoury

There are many varieties of martabak. For example, in Brunei, most martabaks are usually not stuffed, but only made of dough (called martabak kosong) similar to the Indian paratha. Martabak kosong consists of a bread-like dough that is kneaded and prepared similarly to a pancake or other martabak by tossing it into the air, and served piping hot with a sweet curry sauce. In Singapore and Malaysia (where it is called murtabak), the murtabaks are usually filled with spiced beef, chicken or mutton and served with a curry sauce, sweet pickled onions or cucumber in ketchup. Another variant in Malaysia and Singapore is murtabak cheese which uses mozzarella cheese as additional filling. Johorean (Malaysia) and Singaporean murtabak uses more minced meat than most Malaysian murtabak.

The common ingredients of Indonesian egg martabak, besides the dough, is seasoned ground meat (beef, chicken or mutton), sliced green onions, some herbs (optional), beaten duck eggs, salt, and potatoes. Some street vendors mix the ground beef with curry seasoning. In Indonesia, the common spices to make the seasoned ground meat are shallots, garlic, ginger, cumin, coriander, turmeric, some salt, and sometimes a little bit of monosodium glutamate. All the spices are ground or minced and stir-fried altogether. Some martabak makers add extra ingredients and other varieties to make their martabak unique, but they all share the same main dough. To fry martabak, the chef uses a very large flat frying pan or iron griddle. Usually they use vegetable oil to fry, but it is not uncommon to use ghee or butter too.

Before serving, martabak usually is cut into portions. Sometimes it is eaten with sweet and salty soy sauce and pepper. Savoury versions of martabak in Indonesia and Malaysia usually are served with acar or pickled condiment consisting of diced cucumber, sliced carrot, shallots, and sliced chillies in sweetened vinegar whereas in Singapore, the condiment consists of sliced cucumbers in tomato ketchup. In Malaysia, Singapore and some areas in Sumatra, martabak is served with kari (curry) gravy. In Palembang, another variety of martabak is egg-martabak (eggs dropped into the flatten dough before folded while frying) served in curry (usually diced potatoes in beef curry) and topped with chillies in sweet-sour soy sauce called Martabak Haji Abdul Rozak, or more commonly known as Martabak HAR, made popular by an Indian Indonesian named Haji Abdul Rozak. There is also a popular martabak variant from Padang, West Sumatra called Martabak Kubang, which is served with light curry as dipping sauce.

Another variety of martabak, especially in Malaysia and Sumatra (such as in Jambi, Palembang, and Lampung), is one called martabak kentang (potato-stuffed martabak). It usually uses the similar dough as other martabak, but it is stuffed with a mix of diced potatoes, beaten eggs, chopped green onions, and spices instead of beaten egg and ground beef. It is eaten by dipping it into hot sweet-sour soy sauce or curry sauce.

There are many variety of Martabak, specifically in Indonesia, where various types of emerging toppings are being added to innovate the dish. Toppings that are used to substitute the meat are black-pepper sauced minced meat, spicy tuna, shredded Beef Rendang, grilled salmon and Instant noodle. The popular common instant noodle toppings being used are Indomie and Samyang spicy noodle. Mozzarella cheese are sprinkled outside the fried Martabak and then torched to get a melty consistency.

Sweet

Another variety of martabak is called martabak manis (sweet martabak), also known by the name Terang Bulan or Martabak Bangka. This naming however, is only valid in Indonesia, since the identical folded thick pancake is called apam balik instead in Malaysia.

Despite sharing the same name (because they are both folded), the cooking method, dough (which uses yeast and baking soda), and the ingredients (usually vanilla extract is added as essence) are different from egg martabak, giving it a consistency more like a crumpet. While it is baked on a pan, the sweet martabak is spread with butter or margarine, sugar, crushed peanuts, chocolate sprinkles, cheese or other toppings. Before serving, the martabak is folded in half, so the toppings get in the middle of martabak. In parts of Indonesia, egg martabak may also be called Martabak Malabar to distinguish it from sweet martabak.

There are many new varieties of martabak manis, including the addition of green tea powder (matcha), cream cheese, Oreo, and chocolate candies such as Kit Kat, Ovomaltine, Toblerone and Nutella. Aside from that, durian fruits are often used as a topping. 

When ordering Martabak Manis, some stall offer two choice of margarine: Blue Band margarine or Wijsman butter. The Wijsman butter is more costly compared to Blueband margarine as the Wijsman is made by 100% cow milk fat.

See also

 Saudi Arabian cuisine
 Yemeni cuisine
 Malaysian cuisine
 Singaporean cuisine
 Indonesian cuisine
 Indian cuisine
 List of pancakes
 List of stuffed dishes
 Mamak stall
 Okonomiyaki
 Roti canai

Notes

References
 Retno Savitri. Masakan & Jalanan Favorit: Kumpulan Resep. — Jakarta: Better Book Niaga Swadaya Group, 2008. — 305 p. — 
 Husni Rasyad, Retnowati, Eddy SL. Purba. Peluang Bisnis Makanan Berbasis Tepung. Jakarta: PT Elex Media Komputindo, 2003. — 177 p. 
 John Dean. Rahasia Sukses Usaha Kecil dan Menenggah (UGM) Martabak Manis — Jakarta: Gramedia Pustaka Utama, 2007
 Hamza Bogary. The Sheltered Quarter: A Tale of a Boyhood in Mecca. — Austin, Texas: University of Texas Press, 1991. — 121 p. —

External links

 The Culinary Kingdom
 Photos of Arabic mutabbaq being prepared
 Saudi Style Mutabbaq Recipe

Acehnese cuisine
Arabic words and phrases
Bruneian cuisine
Indonesian breads
Indonesian fusion cuisine
Indonesian pancakes
Javanese cuisine
Kue
Malay cuisine
Malaysian breads
Malay words and phrases
Padang cuisine
Pancakes
Saudi Arabian cuisine
Singaporean cuisine
Street food in Indonesia
Stuffed dishes
Yemeni cuisine